Charles William Nation (May 28, 1925 – April 13, 2022), better known as Bill Nation, was an American politician who served as the 45th and 50th Mayor of Cheyenne, Wyoming, and in the Wyoming House of Representatives as a member of the Democratic Party. He unsuccessfully sought the Democratic gubernatorial nomination in 1966 and election as Laramie County Clerk in 1970.

Early life
Charles William Nation was born in Lingle, Wyoming on May 28, 1925. During World War II he served as a gunner aboard a destroyer, the USS Schroeder (DD-501), a Fletcher-class destroyer, this was a ship of the United States Navy, named for Rear Admiral Seaton Schroeder. Entering service in 1943 under Admiral William Halsey Jr.'s command. Bill Nation married Jo Ann Petersen, with whom he had four children.

Career

Mayor

Elections

Prior to entering politics Nation was a professional photographer. In September 1959, Nation announced that he would run for the mayoralty of Cheyenne, Wyoming and was the first person to do so. However, incumbent Mayor Worth Story and state senator R. J. Keelan were the finalists in the primary and Story would later defeat Keelan in the general election.

In 1961, Nation ran for mayor of Cheyenne, placed first in the primary ahead of incumbent Mayor Story, and defeated Story in the general election. On September 30, 1963, Nation filed to run for reelection, placed first in the primary, and won in the general election. Nation announced that he would not seek reelection in 1965, and was succeeded by Bill Herbert Kingham.

Nation announced that he would seek election to the mayoral office on September 12, 1967, but placed third in the primary behind former Mayor R. E. Cheever and state legislator George R. Cox. On October 6, 1969, Nation filed to run in the mayoral election, but was defeated in the general election by incumbent Mayor Floyd Holland.

In 1972, Nation defeated incumbent Mayor James Van Velzor by five votes in the mayoral election, which was the smallest margin of victory for any Cheyenne mayor.

Nation announced at a press conference on July 21, 1976, that he would seek reelection. During the general election campaign he spent $936 against Don Erickson's, who was endorsed by the Cheyenne Central Labor council despite being a Republican, $988.42. In the general election Nation was defeated by Erickson.

In 1980, Nation ran for the mayoral office, placed second in the primary, but lost to incumbent Mayor Erickson in the general election.

Tenure
In 1962, Nation was elected to the board of directors of the Wyoming Association of Municipalities alongside other mayors and local officials in Wyoming. In 1963, he was selected to serve as vice-president of the organization.

After the assassination of John F. Kennedy Nation proposed naming Cheyenne's airport after Kennedy in December 1963, but later chose to not introduce the proposal. In 1974, Nation rejected an attempt by the American Nazi Party to establish a national headquarters in Cheyenne and called for other residents of Cheyenne to write to the American Nazi Party to express their views on the proposal.

In 1973, the Model Cities Program in Cheyenne had charges of discrimination filed against it by the Cheyenne Local Development Corporation due to its budget being decreased and had been investigated by the United States Department of Housing and Urban Development. Nation and Gerald Iverson, the director of the Model Cities Program, denied that there was discrimination, but the city was found guilty of discrimination on June 11.

Other political offices
In 1964, Nation was elected to the Wyoming House of Representatives as one of eleven members from Laramie County as a member of the Democratic Party. In 1965, he was appointed to serve on the Revenue, City and County Affairs, and Welfare, Buildings, Institutions, Sanitary and Medical Affairs committees. On March 9, 1967, Governor Stanley K. Hathaway appointed Bill Nation as one of nine members of the Wyoming Recreation Committee.

On March 8, 1966, Nation announced that he would seek the Democratic gubernatorial nomination. On May 10, he selected Kermit D. Glover, who had served as Nation's campaign manager for his mayoral and state legislature campaigns, as his gubernatorial campaign manager. In the Democratic primary he was defeated by Ernest Wilkerson.

On July 7, 1970, Nation filed to run for Laramie County Clerk and won the Democratic nomination, but lost in the general election against incumbent Republican clerk John B. Huisman.

Death
Nation died in Cheyenne on April 13, 2022, at the age of 96.

Electoral history

References

1925 births
2022 deaths
Mayors of Cheyenne, Wyoming
Democratic Party members of the Wyoming House of Representatives
Military personnel from Wyoming
People from Goshen County, Wyoming
Photographers from Wyoming
United States Navy personnel of World War II